The Max Weber Foundation (Ger. Max Weber Stiftung) is a German humanities research organisation based in Bonn and funded by the German Federal Government. It is composed of ten independent institutes:
Ten German Historical Institutes
German Forum for Art History Paris
German Institute for Japanese Studies (Tokyo)
Orient-Institut Beirut
Orient-Institut Istanbul
Max Weber Forum for South Asian Studies in Delhi

References

External links 
Official website.

 
Organisations based in Bonn